The 1988 Marlboro Cup was a four team soccer tournament hosted at the Los Angeles Memorial Coliseum in August. The four teams competing were the League of Ireland XI, Club Universidad de Guadalajara, El Salvador and Guatemala. The League of Ireland XI lost their first game 3–0 against Club Universidad on August 5 with Mick Neville conceding an own goal. They then lost 1–0 to El Salvador in a third place play off two days later. The tournament was won by Guatemala who beat Club Universidad 3–2 in the final.

Matches

Scorers
 Carlos Castaneda 2
 Byron Perez 2
 Octavio Mora 2

References

1988–89 in Republic of Ireland association football
1988–89 in Mexican football
1988 in Central American football
American soccer friendly trophies